Koan is a generative music engine created by SSEYO, a company founded by Pete Cole and Tim Cole. The Koan technology is now owned by Intermorphic Limited, co-founded by the Cole brothers in 2007.

Architecture and engine 
The SSEYO Koan Interactive Audio Platform (SKIAP) consisted of the core Koan generative music engine (the SSEYO Koan Generative Music Engine. or SKME), a set of authoring tools (SSEYO Koan Pro and SSEYO Koan X), a set of stand-alone Koan Music players (SSEYO Koan Plus, SSEYO Koan File Player and SSEYO Koan Album Player), and a plug-in for internet browsers such as Internet Explorer and Netscape.

Development of the Koan engine started in 1990, when SSEYO was founded, and by 1992, the first version entered beta testing. Distributed by Koch Media, the first edition of Koan was publicly released in 1994, followed by the Koan Pro authoring tool in 1995. 

Later that year, SSEYO brought Koan to the attention of Brian Eno, who quickly showed great interest in the product. He began creating pieces with Koan Pro, collecting and publishing them in his 1996 work "Generative Music 1 with SSEYO Koan Software". This release featured a floppy disk containing the SSEYO Koan Plus player and a set of 12 Koan generative-music pieces that he authored. Eno's early relationship with Koan was captured in his 1996 diary A Year with Swollen Appendices.

Brian Eno, 1996:

Using the pseudonym CSJ Bofop, 1996:

Availability 

The Koan Pro software was available for Microsoft Windows (16- and 32-bit versions), as well as Mac OS 8 and Mac OS 9.
Integration with existing digital audio workstations could be difficult, as the software did not include an audio plug-in interface.

Although SKIAP was developed until 2001, the last extension of the SKME itself was in 1998, as SSEYO concentrated on developing technology around the music engine, including real-time music synthesis and a highly programmable internet browser plug-in wrapper.

Browser plugins 

The SSEYO Koan Plugin for web browsers was programmable in real-time through JavaScript, and was used to create several interesting interactive applications for web browsers. By 2001, Koan included a modular synthesizer; its engine also featured a file format named Vector Audio, which allowed very complicated generative pieces, complete with full synthesizer sound descriptions, to be delivered in only a few thousand bytes of plain text within a Web page. This development led to SSEYO being awarded a BAFTA Interactive Entertainment Award for Technical Innovation in 2001.

Recent versions 

SSEYO was eventually acquired by Tao Group, which was sold in 2007. As a result, Koan and the Koan Pro authoring tool are no longer commercially available.

In 2007, the original creators of Koan (Pete Cole and Tim Cole) founded a company called Intermorphic to create a new generative system called Noatikl. They acquired the Koan technology and thence described Noatikl as "the evolution of Koan".

Noatikl supports importing data from earlier Koan systems, and offers a variety of audio plug-in implementations for easy integration with modern digital audio workstations. In 2012, Intermorphic released Noatikl 2, the first major update since 2007, which introduced the Partikl software synthesizer and Mixtikl mixer product. Noatikl 3,  released in 2015, added a native iOS app together with extensive improvements to the Partikl software synthesizer.

Performances

In 2003, Ars Electronica held a 96-hour musical event entitled "Dark Symphony", playing live Koan music from various artists over a 160,000-watt PA in Linz's Klangpark on the banks of the Danube.

See also
 A Year with Swollen Appendices – a book by Brian Eno which documents his use of Koan
 BAFTA Interactive Entertainment Awards#Technical Innovation

References

General references 
 "Is the Future of Music Generative?" by Paul Brown
 "Electronic, aesthetic and social factors in Net music" by GOLO FÖLLMER
 Floating Points—Dark Symphony - Ars Electronica 2003
 Computer Generated Music Composition by Chong (John) Yu
 http://www.intermorphic.com/tools/noatikl/generative_music.html - Intermorphic on Generative Music and the early history of Koan
 http://www.intermorphic.com/news/pressReleases/prnoatikl2_Generative_Music_Lab_for_Mac_Windows.html - Noatikl 2 release information

Computer music software